Maz Abd Ali may refer to:
 Maz Abd Ali-ye Bala
 Maz Abd Ali-ye Pain